William Kaufman may refer to:
William S. Kaufman (1849–1916), American architect
William E. Kaufman, Massachusetts rabbi, retired
William Kaufman (director), American director of One in the Chamber and The Brave (2019)

See also
William Kaufmann (1918–2008), American nuclear strategist